The fontaine Palatine is a fountain in Paris located at 12 rue Garancière, in the 6th arrondissement, near the Luxembourg Palace and Luxembourg Garden.

History 

The fountain was built by Anne Henriette of Bavaria (1648–1723), against the wall of the commons of her residence, as a gift to the people of the neighborhood.  She was Princess of Palatinate-Simmern by birth, and by marriage was Princess of Condé, the widow of Henri Jules, Prince of Condé.  The fountain's waterworks were probably designed by Jean Beausire, the chief of public works and designer of fountains for Louis XIV and Louis XV.  When the commons were destroyed and a new building was constructed in 1913, the fountain was preserved and attached to the wall of the new building, in its original location.  It was declared an historical monument of France in 1962.

Description 
The fountain is a simple niche in the wall the size of a door, with little decoration. Over the niche is a plaque with an inscription in Latin of the dedication of the fountain. Below it is a bronze mascaron of a head of a lion, through which the water flowed.

 The inscription reads, in Latin:

Bibliography 
 Marie-Hélène Levadé and  Hugues Marcouyeau, Les fontaines de Paris : l'eau pour le plaisir - Paris, 2008 - 
 Daniel Rabreau, Paris et ses fontaines - Paris, 1997 - 
 Daniel Rabreau, editor, Les fontaines de Paris, de la Renaissance à nos jours - Paris, 1995 -

Notes and references 

Fountains in Paris
Buildings and structures in the 6th arrondissement of Paris